Aqupallqa (Quechua aqu sand, pallqa, p'allqa, p'alqa forked, branched, fork, bifurcation, "sand bifurcation", Hispanicized spellings Acopalca, Acospalca) is a mountain in the Cordillera Central in the Andes of Peru, about  high. It is situated in the Lima Region, Yauyos Province, Tanta District. Aqupallqa lies north of the mountain Wayna Qutuni and the lake Tikllaqucha and northwest of the mountain Qutuni.

References 

Mountains of Peru
Mountains of Lima Region